Rustbelt Radio is the Pittsburgh Independent Media Center's weekly radio program which introduces itself as "news from the grassroots, news overlooked by the corporate media".

Production 
Rustbelt Radio is produced by a volunteer collective working primarily in the Pittsburgh area.  Volunteers conduct interviews and record events.  They then edit the audio using Audacity, a free and open-source digital audio editor.  The show is organized each week using a wiki in a collaborative process.  The show is produced, recorded and aired live on Monday evenings from the studios of WRCT-FM.

Mass media in Pittsburgh
Indymedia
Alternative radio programs
American public radio programs

2004 radio programme debuts